Probuild was an Australian construction company that traded from 1987 until 2022.

History
Probuild was founded in 1987 by Phil Mehtren. In 2000 it was purchased by Wilson Bayly Holmes Ovcon. An attempt to sell the business to the China Communications Construction Company in 2021 was blocked by the Government of Australia on national security grounds. In February 2022, it was placed in voluntary administration by Wilson Bayly Holmes Ovcon with Deloitte appointed administrator.

Roberts & Co took over five projects in Melbourne, while the Western Australian business was sold to SRG Global. Hutchinson Builders took over the 443 Queen Street, Brisbane project.

Notable projects
Notable projects completed by Probuild included:
Aurora Melbourne Central 
Greenland Centre, Sydney
Marina Tower Melbourne
Netball Central, Sydney
Victoria One

At the time of its cessation, Probuild was involved in the construction of West Side Place and 443 Queen Street, Brisbane.

References

Companies based in Melbourne
Construction and civil engineering companies established in 1987
Construction and civil engineering companies of Australia
1987 establishments in Australia
2022 establishments in Australia